John W. Limbong (born 1957) is an Indonesian educator and businessman who is the founder and president of the University of International Golden Indonesia. He received a MS in economics in 1982 from Brigham Young University (BYU) and subsequently earned a PhD from the University of Utah in 1982. Limbong says that while a student at BYU, one night he had a dream where Brigham Young visited him and asked him to establish a university in Limbong's native Jakarta, Indonesia. Limbong vacillated, as he worked for Bank Indonesia for a while, but he later quit that job to pursue this dream.

References 

Brigham Young University alumni
University of Utah alumni
1957 births
Living people
Academic staff of the University of International Golden Indonesia
People of Batak descent